Formia is a city and comune in the province of Latina, on the Mediterranean coast of Lazio, Italy. It is located halfway between Rome and Naples, and lies on the Roman-era Appian Way. It has a population of 38,095.

History

The city of Formia was originated by the Italic population of the Aurunci. It appeared for the first time in history in 338 BC, when, during the Latin Wars, it received the Civitas sine suffragio, together with the city of Fondi. Throughout antiquity, the city of Caieta was also part of the Formian territory. In the Roman Republic era it was called Formiae (derived from Hormia or Ormiai, for its excellent landing). It was a renowned resort during the imperial era and Horace calls it "the city of the Mamurrae" as the rich and noble equestrian family of Mamurra had stong interests there, including the villa-estate nearby at Gianola which can still be seen. 

Cicero also had a villa there and he was assassinated on the Appian Way just outside the town in 43 BC, and his tomb remains a minor tourist destination. The city was also the seat of St. Erasmus's martyrdom, by being disemboweled around 303 AD, during the persecutions of Diocletian. St. Erasmus later also became known as Saint Elmo the patron saint of sailors. Paulinus of Nola and Therasia stopped at Formiae on their journey back to Nola after visiting Rome, Easter 408. There they read Augustine's letter 95 addressed to them.

After the fall of the Western Roman Empire, the city was sacked by barbarians and the population moved to two distinct burghs on the nearby hill, which were under the rule of Gaeta. Charles II of Anjou built a fortress in the maritime burgh, Mola di Gaeta. The other burgh was known as Castellone, from the castle erected there in the mid-14th century by Onorato I Caetani, count of Fondi.

The two villages were united again in 1863 under the name of Formia.  The reunited city was badly damaged in 1943–44 in bombing operations and the Battle of Anzio.

Geography
Formia lies on the Tyrrhenian Sea, in southern Lazio, close to the town of Gaeta and next to the borders of Campania region.

The municipality borders with Esperia (FR), Gaeta, Itri, Minturno and Spigno Saturnia. It counts the hamlets (frazioni) of Castellonorato, Gianola-Santo Janni, Marànola, Penitro and Trivio.

Main sights

The most famous monument of Formia is the mausoleum traditionally identified with the Tomb of Cicero: it is a  tower on the old Appian Way, enclosed in a large,  funerary precinct.

Other sights include:
Tower of Mola 
Tower of Castellone
Roman cistern, one of the world's largest. Similar to the structures in Constantinople and in the Domitian's villa of Albano, it dates from the 1st century BC.
Remains of the so-called Roman Villa of Mamurra at Gianola, partly destroyed in 1943, including the cisterns of "Maggiore' and of "36 columns", aqueducts, cryptoporticus and thermal baths. At the centre of the villa at the highest point of the promontory was a grandiose octagonal building also known as the "Temple of Janus" which was flanked by two wings and two porticoes which sloped down towards the sea. Nearby at Porticciolo Romano are the remains of its fishponds for fish farming. Five busts of male heads were recently excavated dating from the 2nd/3rd century AD.
Many remains of Roman villas along the coast
Roman buildings in the town
Church of San Giovanni Battista e Lorenzo, known from 841. It was almost entirely destroyed during World War II. It houses a panel by Antoniazzo Romano (c. 1490)
Church of "San Michele"
Church of San Luca, known from the 15th century. It has a recently discovered crypt with frescoes of Episodes of the New Testament and Madonna del Latte.
Renaissance monastery and church of Sant'Erasmo. It was erected on the alleged site of the saint's martyrdom.
Archaeological Museum.
Regional Park of Gianola and Mount of Scauri.
Formia War Memorial, with the large bronze sculpture Sacraficio by Dora Ohlfsen-Bagge

Sport
Formia is the seat of the National Athletics School of the Italian National Olympic Committee, founded in 1955. Athletes such as Pietro Mennea and Giuseppe Gibilisco trained here. Formia is also a hub for cycling events of various types; road cycling and mountain biking  All of which gives access to Parks in Gaeta and Formia; Parco Monte Orlando, Parco Regionale Riviera di Ulisse, Parco Naturale dei Monti Aurunci, and Tours to Rome via the Old Highway. Formia also has great water sports to enjoy; windsurfing and sailing.

Transportation
Formia itself is one of the most important transportation hub of southern Lazio. The Rome–Formia–Naples railway passes through Formia-Gaeta railway station, from which visitors and residents may travel by bus to Gaeta, Minturno, Spigno and other local towns.

Ferries and hydrofoils connect Formia to Ponza, Ischia and Ventotene.

Twin towns - sister cities
Formia is twinned with:
 Ferrara, Italy
 Fleury-les-Aubrais, France, since 2004
 Gračanica, Bosnia and Herzegovina
 Haninge, Sweden
 Santeramo in Colle, Italy

People
 Antonio Sicurezza, painter
 Vittorio Foa, politician
 Amadeo Bordiga, politician
 Dino Fava, professional footballer
 James V. Monaco, songwriter

See also
S.S. Formia Calcio

References

External links

 Formia official website
Site of the "Tomb of Cicero" in Google Maps
https://www.instagram.com/

 
Coastal towns in Lazio